Lorentz Martin Eide (January 30, 1924 – March 27, 1992) was a U.S. American soldier and Olympic biathlete.

Eide was born in Bergen, Norway. He served in the 38th Regimental Combat Team, Colorado. At the age of 24, in the rank of a private, he participated as member of the military patrol team At the 1948 Winter Olympics. The U.S. military patrol squad was led by first lieutenant Donald Weihs, who broke his ski after the team completed more than three-fourths of the 21,5 miles course. Weihs had to trample the last six miles with it. The team placed eighth of eight.

References 

1924 births
1992 deaths
American military patrol (sport) runners
American male biathletes
Olympic biathletes of the United States
Military patrol competitors at the 1948 Winter Olympics
United States Army soldiers
Norwegian emigrants to the United States